The Chetco Bar Fire was a wildfire in the Kalmiopsis Wilderness, Oregon, United States. The fire, which was caused by a lightning strike and first reported on July 12, 2017. It burned  as of November 4, when it was declared 100% contained. The Chetco Bar Fire area is subject to warm, dry winds known as the Brookings effect (also known as Chetco Effect), driven by high pressure over the Great Basin. The fire re-burned portions of the 2002 Biscuit Fire and the 1987 Silver Fire. The fire directly impacted communities surrounding it, causing mandatory evacuations.

Events

The Chetco Bar Fire was started by a lightning strike in the Kalmiopsis Wilderness near the Chetco River. It was reported on July 12, 2017 at 1:45 PM. By July 15, it was primarily burning in the scar of the 2002 Biscuit Fire and had only burned . At this time, fire crews expressed concerns about accessing the fire due to difficult and dangerous terrain.

Up until this day, the crews were not using technology to gather acreage data, but estimates. As a precautionary response, the Rogue River – Siskiyou National Forest closed select forest service roads and trails.

Fears of an upcoming heatwave led to the creation of public use restrictions on fires in the area. By August 9, three additional trails were closed and on August 12, additional use restrictions were put in place regarding campfires and smoking.

On August 19, the fire, in Brookings effect wind, had spread  and the first mandatory evacuations were put in place - for the top of Gardner Ridge Road and Cate Road past Hazel Camp area, Wilson Creek area, and along the Chetco River 3 miles up the North Bank Chetco River Road from Social Security Bar to the Wilderness Retreat area. Another mandatory evacuation was put in place, on August 21, for areas between Highway 101 and Carpenterville Road, north to the Pistol River.

Six days later, on August 24, the fire had burned , burning in steep and rugged terrain about five miles north of Brookings, Oregon. The smoke from the fire began impacting visibility along Highway 101 and creating dramatic hazes in Gold Beach and in Brookings. By August 30, the National Guard had joined the fire fighting efforts.

Entering September, the fire continued to burn with mandatory evacuations being put in place all residents on Illinois River Road within US Forest Service Boundaries, including the Oak Flat community.

The fire had spread into Curry County. In Josephine County, crews began structure assessments of the communities of O'Brien, Cave Junction, and Selma. Governor Kate Brown, US Forest Service Chief Tony Tooke, Senator Ron Wyden, Major General Michael Stencel, and House Representative Peter DeFazio visited the fire camp.

The fire was announced as being 100% contained on November 2.

Impact

The Checto Bar Post-Fire Burned Area Emergency Response (BAER) team completed their evaluation of the fire's impact on October 11, 2017. The fires burned  of redwood tree stands, with  being 75 to 100 percent completely destroyed.

Geological hazards are also of concern, including rock falls, landslides, debris flows, slope failures, and soil erosion. Hillslopes have lost much of their overstory, ground cover, and roughness causing a decline in water storage, which increases the likelihood of flooding. Coho salmon habitats have seen increases in debris.

Regarding human risk, BAER reported concerns with roads and rivers, streams and creeks. 136 miles of roads received fire treatment, including debris removal and repairing water culverts. 18.5 miles of trails received fire treatment, primarily to assist with water drainage. Recreational sites saw signage placement for warning the public about safety concerns, tree removal, hazardous waste clean up and some properties have been closed. The highest concern recreation areas are SF Chetco, Mineral Hill Fork Creeks, Eagle Creek and Panther Creek.

Cultural values were found to be at risk after the fire, with heritage sites experiencing low to high intensity effects to the surrounding vegetation. Sites impacted include the Wheeler Ridge Japanese Bombing Site, the Quail Prairie Mountain Lookout and a prehistoric Native American site.

The Chetco Bar Fire's impacts on wildlife has been reported as "high" in the Eagle Creek area of the Chetco River. Forest wide, 26 nest patches of northern spotted owls were impacted with 85 percent sustaining moderate to high burn intensities. 37 percent of suitable marbled murrelet nesting habitat was burned at moderate to high severity.

BAER reported concerns with municipal water supplies in Brookings and Harbor, primarily with intakes experiencing channel scour during high peak flow events. Port of Brookings Harbor experienced increased debris and sediment during winter 2017.

It also impacted local viewing of the solar eclipse of August 21, 2017.

Gallery

References

External links

 

2017 Oregon wildfires
2017 wildfires
Wildfires in Oregon
Curry County, Oregon